Mukim Tamoi is a mukim in Brunei-Muara District, Brunei. It is part of Kampong Ayer, the traditional stilt settlements on the Brunei River in the country's capital Bandar Seri Begawan. The population was 1,389 in 2016.

Demographics 
As of 2016 census, the population was 1,389 with  males and  females. The mukim had 208 households occupying 207 dwellings. The entire population lived in urban areas.

Villages 
In 2016, the mukim comprised the following census villages:

Kampong Limbongan and Kampong Ujong Bukit have since ceased to exist due to the redevelopment project to the Kedayan River and the construction of the public park Taman Mahkota Jubli Emas.

The mukim has also been subsumed under the municipal area of Bandar Seri Begawan.

Infrastructures 

The local primary schools include Bendahara Lama Primary School and Haji Tarif Primary School.

Duli Pengiran Muda Mahkota Pengiran Muda Haji Al-Muhtadee Billah Mosque is the sole local mosque. The construction began in August 1995; it was opened on 16 January 1999. It can accommodate 1,500 worshippers. The mosque is named after the Crown Prince Al-Muhtadee Billah.

Notes

References 

Tamoi
Brunei-Muara District